Maïder Laval (born 18 May 1970) is a former professional tennis player from France.

Biography
An under-18s national champion, Laval competed in the women's singles main draw of every French Open from 1987 to 1991. In the first two years she also played in the juniors and was a girls' doubles finalist at the 1988 French Open, partnering Julie Halard.

Laval, who also featured twice at the Australian Open, represented the France Federation Cup team in 1988, for a World Group tie against West Germany. She made her only appearance in the doubles rubber, with Catherine Suire, which they lost in three sets to Isabel Cueto and Eva Pfaff.

During her time on the professional tour she reached a best singles ranking on tour of 139 in the world. She was a quarter-finalist at Bayonne in 1990 and twice reached the quarter-finals at Palermo, in 1990 and 1991. These runs included two wins over players ranked in the world's top-50, Rachel McQuillan in Bayonne and Raffaella Reggi at the 1991 Palermo Open.

ITF finals

Singles (3–1)

Doubles (0–1)

References

External links
 
 
 

1970 births
Living people
French female tennis players